The Sierra de La Cabrera is a mountain range near Madrid, Spain. It is a subrange of the Sierra de Guadarrama.

See also
La Cabrera

Sierra de Guadarrama